The following is a list of the 82 municipalities (comuni) of the Metropolitan City of Palermo, Sicily, Italy.

List

See also
List of municipalities of Italy

References

Palermo